Mycophaga testacea is a species of fly in the family Anthomyiidae. It is found in the  Palearctic . For identification see

References

External links
Images representing Mycophaga testacea at BOLD

Anthomyiidae
Insects described in 1834
Muscomorph flies of Europe